Joseph Johnston Bennett Jr. (April 9, 1901 – October 23, 1975) was an American football and basketball player for the Georgia Bulldogs of the University of Georgia.  Bennett was captain of the 1923 team, and considered one of the best kick-blockers in the south. "Prior to the 1960s, Bennett is likely Georgia's most outstanding tackle."  After university, he became an executive with Coca-Cola in Atlanta and Los Angeles. Bennett was inducted into the State of Georgia Sports Hall of Fame in 1984.

Biography

Early years
Joseph Johnston Bennett, Jr. was born on April 1, 1901 in Statesboro, Georgia to Joseph Sr., a Baptist minister, and Mary Conyers.

University of Georgia
Bennett was a prominent tackle for coaches Herman Stegeman and Kid Woodruff's  Georgia Bulldogs football team from 1920 to 1923, starting as a freshman. During his playing years Georgia's football team compiled a record of 25–9–4. The team shared Southern Intercollegiate Athletic Association (SIAA) titles in 1920 and 1921. Bennett received Walter Camp All-America honorable mention in 1922. An All-Time Georgia All-Star Team published in 1935 had Bennett as a first-team tackle.

Death
Bennett died on October 23, 1975 in Alameda, California, at the age of 74.

See also
1922 College Football All-America Team
1923 College Football All-Southern Team

References

American football tackles
Georgia Bulldogs football players
Georgia Bulldogs basketball players
Coca-Cola people
All-Southern college football players
Players of American football from Georgia (U.S. state)
People from Statesboro, Georgia
1901 births
1975 deaths
American men's basketball players